Jeffrey Robert Hammond (born 19 April 1950) is a former Australian cricketer who played in five Test matches and one One Day International in 1972 and 1973.

A fast bowler, Hammond was described as having "raw pace, a great short ball and an ability to swing it away late from the right-handers." Hammond made his first-class cricket debut for South Australia in 1969 and was included in the Australian squad for the 1972 Ashes tour of England, where he played his sole One Day International, taking 1/41.

Hammond kept his place in the Australian squad picked for the tour of the West Indies, where, in the absence of the injured Dennis Lillee, he made his Test debut. The role of Hammond and his opening bowling partner Max Walker has been listed as a key factor in Australia's surprise series victory.
  
Following his retirement from cricket in 1980, Hammond was appointed South Australian coach in 1993, leading South Australia to the Sheffield Shield in 1995/96. He was appointed to the South Australian Cricket Association Board in 2007.

Hammond has a Diploma of Electronic Engineering and was a member of the Telecom Australia's Management team in the early 1990s before returning to cricket administration.

Hammond's son Ashley also played cricket for South Australia.

References

1950 births
Living people
Australia Test cricketers
Australia One Day International cricketers
South Australia cricketers
Kensington cricketers
Prospect cricketers
Australian cricketers
Cricketers from Adelaide
Australian cricket coaches